Coleophora wyethiae is a moth of the family Coleophoridae. It is found in the United States, including California.

The larvae feed on the leaves of Wyethia angustifolia, Aster and Balsamorhiza species. They create an annulate case.

References

wyethiae
Moths of North America
Moths described in 1882